Stanley Kwan (traditional Chinese: 關錦鵬; simplified Chinese: 关锦鹏); born 9 October 1957) is a Hong Kong film director and producer.

Kwan landed a job at TVB after receiving a mass communications degree at Hong Kong Baptist College. Kwan's first film was Women (1985), which starred Chow Yun-fat, and was a big box-office success.

Kwan's films often deal sympathetically with the plight of women and their struggles with romantic affairs of the heart.  Rouge (1987), Full Moon in New York (1989), Center Stage (1992; a.k.a. Actress), a biopic on silent film star Ruan Lingyu and Everlasting Regret (2005), are all such typical Kwan films. Red Rose White Rose (1994) is an adaptation of an Eileen Chang novel. The film was entered into the 45th Berlin International Film Festival. His 1998 film Hold You Tight won the Alfred Bauer Prize and Teddy Award at the 48th Berlin International Film Festival.

Kwan came out as a gay man in 1996 in Yang ± Yin, his documentary looking at the history of Chinese-language film through the prism of gender roles and sexuality. He is one of the few openly gay directors in Asia and one of the very few to have worked on these themes. His Lan Yu (2001) adapts a gay love story originally published on the Internet.

Kwan is also an occasional lecturer at the City University of Hong Kong, where he teaches directing and writing to students.

Filmography

Film 
 Women 女人心 (1985)
 Love Unto Waste 地下情 (1986)
 Rouge 胭脂扣 (1987)
 Full Moon in New York 人在紐約 (1989)
 Too Happy for Words 兩個女人，一個靚一個唔靚 (1992)
 Center Stage, a.k.a. The New China Woman or Actress 阮玲玉 (1991)
 Red Rose White Rose 紅玫瑰白玫瑰 (1994)
 Yang ± Yin: Gender in Chinese Cinema 男生女相：華語電影之性别 (1996)
 Hold You Tight 愈快樂愈墮落 (1997) (Teddy Award in 1998)
 Still Love You After All These 念你如昔 (1997)
 The Island Tales 有時跳舞 (1999)
 Lan Yu 藍宇 (2001)
 Everlasting Regret 長恨歌 (2005)
 Showtime (2010)
First Night Nerves 八個女人一台戲 （2018）

Further reading 
 Johannes Rosenstein (ed.): Stanley Kwan (= Film-Konzepte 45). Munich: edition text + kritik 2017.

See also
 Hong Kong Second Wave

References

External links

 Stanley Kwan Kam-Pang at hkmdb.com

1957 births
Living people
Alumni of Hong Kong Baptist University
Hong Kong male film actors
Hong Kong film directors
Hong Kong film producers
Gay actors
LGBT film directors
Hong Kong LGBT people
Hong Kong artists